The Buck O'Neil Bridge is a triple arch bridge that spans the Missouri River in Kansas City, Missouri, in the United States. It first opened for traffic September 9, 1956 as the Broadway Bridge. It was built at a cost of $12 million.  It was a toll bridge until 1991.

It replaced the Second Hannibal Bridge just to its east which had handled auto traffic on its upper level.

It provides access from downtown Kansas City to the Charles B. Wheeler Downtown Airport and to the city of Riverside, Missouri.

U.S. Route 169, which the bridge carries across the river, never enters North Kansas City, Missouri, but skirts the western border.

On June 24, 2016 the Bridge was officially renamed from the Broadway Bridge to the Buck O'Neil Bridge named after the Kansas City Monarchs player and manager John Jordan "Buck" O'Neil. The bridge is currently being replaced.

See also
 
 
 
 List of crossings of the Missouri River

References

External links

 Broadway (Hwy 169) Missouri River Bridge in Kansas City, Missouri

Through arch bridges in the United States
Bridges in Kansas City, Missouri
Bridges completed in 1956
Bridges over the Missouri River
Former toll bridges in Missouri
Road bridges in Missouri
U.S. Route 169
Bridges of the United States Numbered Highway System